Savin was incorporated in 1959 by Max M. and Robert K. Low, and the company was named after Max Low's son-in-law, Robert S. Savin.  The firm was run by Low's son, Robert K. Low (finance, management and marketing) and E. Paul Charlap (research and development). It was known primarily for its unusual line of liquid-toner photocopiers, which set it apart from other companies that manufactured dry-toner equipment such as Konica, Xerox, Canon, Sharp, and Kodak.
  
During the 1960s and through the 1980s, Savin developed and sold a line of black-and-white liquid-toner copiers that implemented the technology that was based on patents held by the company. These copiers easily competed with Powder based technology with their far superior fine line resolution once the era of early Electrostatic transfer was done and the liquid was charged in the machine. The reservoir, called a Tank, had to be cleaned and fluid changed at the regular maintenance. Savin Developed very deep Tanks and spring mounts for these copiers used on Naval Vessels. One version was the Savin 772. Shore based service and parts was provided by Savin dealers local to many US Ports. In the later 1980's Savin invented a much darker ink called Landa to compete with the improving Powder Copiers.  Savin's copiers were manufactured by Ricoh Company and distributed by Savin in the US and Canada through 50 branch offices and 500 dealers, and under licenses from Savin to Nashua for Europe and South America, and through Ricoh for the Far East. 

Although it was competing against major corporations such as Konica, Xerox, IBM and Kodak, Savin was able to develop its niche of economy-grade copiers through its persistent marketing efforts, which were targeted especially towards educational institutions.  Savin had sales of approximately $500 million (along with royalties from licensees of $10 million), and was listed on the New York Stock Exchange.  In 1982 it was bought by Canadian Development Corporation, and then acquired by another firm which promptly discontinued the marketing.  This led to a steep decline in revenue from both sales and royalties. In the early 1990s Savin Phased out the Liquid copiers and jumped on the low cost Powder copier business which had much improved in quality over the years prior. Most of Savin copier business was with machines that made under 50 copies per minute, where it held a low price point that was hard to match for other companies. 
 
In 1995, Ricoh Company acquired Savin Corporation, at which time Savin was made a wholly owned sales subsidiary.  This resulted in all Savin machines merely being rebadged Ricoh machines, which use dry toner.

External links
Savin Corporation (www.savin.com)
Ricoh Corporation (www.ricoh.com)
Savin Corporation website for other than USA  (savin-usa.com)

Notes

Electronics companies of the United States
Ricoh
Companies acquired by Ricoh